Agbarjin (also spelled Agvarjin and Akbarjin;), (1423–1454) was a claimant to the throne of the Northern Yuan dynasty in 1453. He was the youngest brother of Tayisung Khan Toghtoa Bukha and Manduul Khan.

Tayisung Khan appointed Agbarjin jinong over his ulus in 1433. When Toghtoa Bukha attempted to eliminate Esen Taishi's influence at the court, the Oirats offered Agbarjin the throne of khaganship for his betrayal. Even though the latter's son, Qara-qurtag Duuren taiji, persuaded his father not to accept this offer, the Oirats and Agbarjin attacked and defeated the Khagan, forcing him to flee westward. Tayisung Khagan Toghtoa Bukha was killed by his former father-in-law Tsabdan, whose daughter Altaghana had been banished from the ordo (palace).

The Oirats did not trust him, as he had betrayed his own eldest brother. Soon after the death of the Tayisung Khan, Agbarjin was invited by Esen to a banquet. When the former and his entourages arrived, Esen and the Oirat leaders murdered all Borjigin males in his entourage except Qara-qurtag, who fled and was later murdered, either in Moghulistan or Central Siberia. Agbarjin's death paved the way for Esen's enthronement in 1454.

See also
 List of khans of the Northern Yuan dynasty

References

Year of birth unknown
1454 deaths
Northern Yuan rulers
15th-century Mongol rulers
15th-century Chinese monarchs
Jinong